"In Theory" is the 25th episode of the fourth season of the American science fiction television series Star Trek: The Next Generation, originally aired on June 3, 1991, in broadcast syndication. The episode was written by Joe Menosky and Ronald D. Moore and was the directorial debut of cast member Patrick Stewart. 

Set in the 24th century, the series follows the adventures of the Starfleet crew of the  Federation starship Enterprise-D. In this episode, Data (Brent Spiner) accepts the affections of shipmate Jenna D'Sora (Michele Scarabelli) and pursues a romantic relationship with her. However, Jenna soon comprehends the downside of a "programmed" relationship. As the couple attempts to work out their problems, the Enterprise moves into an area of space rendered deadly by a nebula that is tearing small gaps in the fabric of space, deforming any matter that comes into contact with them.

"In Theory" received Nielsen ratings of 9.8 percent, making it the second least viewed episode of the fourth season on first broadcast. Reviewers were ambivalent about the episode. They criticized elements of the plot, such as the choice of Captain Jean-Luc Picard to pilot a shuttle in a subplot instead of an experienced shuttle pilot, and felt that Data's romance was ineffective. Keith DeCandido had the view that it was a re-hash of the second season episode "The Dauphin".

Summary 
This episode features a science fiction love story between Data and Jenna D'Sora (played by guest actress Michele Scarabelli). Over the course of the episode Data (an android) attempts to understand human romantic relationships by soliciting advice from his crewmates, then develops theories about the most effective means of maintaining close interpersonal contact, and tries to use these theories to initiate a romantic relationship with Jenna.

Plot
Data, an android, and Jenna D'Sora are in the torpedo room configuring several probes with which the Enterprise will explore a nearby nebula. D'Sora explains that she just split up with her boyfriend and Data attempts to comfort her. Later they play together in a chamber concert along with Keiko O'Brien (Rosalind Chao). D'Sora complains of her abilities as a musician, but Data insists that he could not hear anything wrong.

Later on the bridge, Data is reviewing the information from the probes sent into the nebula. He theorises that life might have evolved differently in the nebula because of the volume of dark matter detected. Captain Jean-Luc Picard (Patrick Stewart) orders the ship to the nearest planet within the nebula. Data and D'Sora configure further probes, when she kisses him on the cheek and then on the lips, before leaving the room. Data seeks the opinion of his friends, including Picard, Guinan (Whoopi Goldberg), Geordi La Forge (LeVar Burton), Commander William Riker (Jonathan Frakes), Deanna Troi (Marina Sirtis) and Worf (Michael Dorn). Data decides to pursue the relationship and goes to D'Sora's cabin with a bunch of flowers, where he informs her that he created a romantic subroutine for the relationship.

Meanwhile, the Enterprise is approaching the planet. Picard enters his ready room and finds his belongings scattered on the floor. He calls in Worf, who cannot explain their displacement. D'Sora arrives at Data's cabin where he is painting. She tells him to continue, but is then annoyed when he does so, causing him some confusion. The ship arrives at the coordinates for the planet but finds nothing there. Then it suddenly appears as the ship's computer warns of a depressurization in the observation lounge. The crew investigate and find all the furniture piled in one corner of the room.

Data is visiting D'Sora, but she seems unhappy and he is acting erratically in order to find an appropriate response to make her happy. It becomes evident to the crew that the nebula is causing distortions in space; Picard orders the ship into warp to leave the nebula as quickly as possible but this speeds up the distortions. Whilst investigating them, Lieutenant Van Mayter (Georgina Shore) is killed when a distortion embeds her into the deck. Data discovers that dark matter is causing the distortions. The ship can detect the pockets at short range, but not in enough time to move out of the way. Worf proposes using a shuttle to lead the Enterprise out, and Picard insists on piloting it alone.

Picard pilots the shuttle through the field of distortion pockets. Chief Miles O'Brien (Colm Meaney) transports the Captain back to the ship before the shuttle is destroyed. The approach resulted in the Enterprise nearing the edge of the nebula, and they quickly depart. Afterwards, D'Sora reveals to Data over a romantic dinner in his quarters that she broke up with her boyfriend because he was emotionally unavailable and then pursued him because he was the same. Data realises that she is breaking up with him and explains that he will delete the subroutine. D'Sora departs and Data is seemingly unperturbed, although his cat, Spot, jumps into his lap as if to comfort him.

Production
"In Theory" marked the directorial debut of cast member Patrick Stewart. Stewart sought the advice of fellow cast member Jonathan Frakes prior to filming, as Frakes had already directed three episodes of The Next Generation, making Stewart the second cast member to do so. Frakes thought that Stewart did a good job, saying that "he was fabulous and took to it beautifully".

The story was written by Joe Menosky and Ronald D. Moore, who were the show's two executive story editors during season four. The guest stars included Michele Scarabelli, who had previously appeared as Susan on Alien Nation. Pamela Winslow appeared as Ensign McKnight, who had previously been referred to in the episode "Clues" but not seen on screen.

Reception
The episode aired during the week commencing June 3, 1991, in broadcast syndication. According to Nielsen Media Research, it received ratings of 9.8 percent. This means that it was watched by 9.8 percent of all households watching television during its timeslot. It was the second lowest viewed episode of the season on first broadcast, only ahead of "Family". Both of those episodes were the only ones in season four to receive ratings under 10 percent.

Several reviewers re-watched the episode after the end of the series. Zack Handlen watched the episode for The A.V. Club in February 2011. He thought that the two plots didn't tie in together but said of the episode that "while I didn't exactly love it, I'm happy it exists". He thought that the scenes with D'Sora and Data were "very, very odd", and that the ending didn't reveal anything new about Data at all. The subplot involving the nebula was described as "an interesting hook, but it doesn't go anywhere". He gave the episode a B grade. Jamahl Epsicokhan at his website Jammer's Reviews described the main plot as "pleasant enough" but couldn't understand D'Sora's motivations in pursuing the relationship with Data. He described the subplot as "pure perfunctory filler barely worthy of mention" and didn't know why Picard piloted the shuttle instead of a more experienced shuttle pilot. He gave the episode a score of 2.5/4.

Michelle Erica Green watched the episode for TrekNation in May 2009. She also thought that it was a pleasant episode but that it "never approaches greatness". She felt that D'Sora never achieved the intimacy that Tasha Yar did with Data, and that the subplot was simply something created so that Picard had something to do. She summed up the ending of the episode by saying that "I don't believe that Data can't be hurt emotionally, but he's more invested in his cat than he ever seems to be in Jenna D'Sora." Keith DeCandido reviewed the episode for Tor.com in May 2012, describing it as a "clunker" and a re-hash of the earlier episode "The Dauphin" but "without the gravitas". He thought that having Picard pilot the shuttle was ridiculous, especially as the character admitted in the episode "11001001" that it had been years since he had worked the helm of a ship. He summed it up saying that, "ultimately, it's a rehash of a Wesley Crusher episode. A really really bad Wesley Crusher episode" and gave it a score of two out of ten.

In 2019, Den of Geek noted this episode for featuring a romance story. 
In 2019, Screen Rant ranked "In Theory" the fifth funniest episode of Star Trek:The Next Generation.

Home media release 
The first home media release of "In Theory" was on VHS cassette, appearing on September 5, 1991, in the United States and Canada. The episode was later released on LaserDisc on September 24, 1996, and also included on the Star Trek: The Next Generation season four DVD box set, released in the United States on September 3, 2002.  It was also one of the episodes included in the anthology DVD box set Star Trek Fan Collective - Captain's Log, for which it was picked by Patrick Stewart; the set also includes the TNG episodes "Chain of Command" (Parts I & II) and "Darmok" among other episodes from the franchise.

The first Blu-ray release was in the United Kingdom on July 29, 2013, followed by the United States on July 30.

Notes

References

External links

 

Star Trek: The Next Generation (season 4) episodes
1991 American television episodes
Television episodes written by Ronald D. Moore
Television episodes directed by Patrick Stewart